Meilgaard Castle (Danish: Meilgård Gods)  is a castle and estate located in Glesborg Parish in Norddjurs Municipality, Denmark.
It is situated between Fjellerup Strand and Bønnerup Strand on the Djursland peninsula.

History
The estate known as Medelgård was first mentioned when the estate changed title in 1345.  The current castle dates from 1573; it was extended in 1873 with the main building thoroughly rebuilt in the period 1888-1891
 

Over the centuries, the estate changed ownership between many different families.
Meilgaard was acquired in 1868 by Baron Christian  Iuel-Brockdorff  (1827-1888) and is now owned by Michael F. Iuel and his wife Princess Désirée of Schaumburg-Lippe.  Part of it has been converted to five private apartments.  A former farm building is being used as a restaurant.

Meilgaard Midden 
The estate is of 2.070 hectares, of which 543 are farmed and 1.220 are forested.
The coastal forest of Nederskov just north of the castle is home to the world's first scientifically excavated Midden (køkkenmødding). In 1848 the National Museum of Denmark organized an archaeological excavation of the Meilgaard midden under the direction of  Jens Jacob Asmussen Worsaae (1821–1885) and Johan Georg Forchhammer (1794–1865).
Scientists concluded that the oyster shells was not ordinary natural deposits, but leftovers and waste from the Ertebølle culture dating to the end of the Mesolithic period (ca 5300 BC – 3950 BC).

List of owners 

 (1340-1345) Niels Griis
 (1345-1370) Vogn Pedersen
 (1370-1390) Peder Markvardsen Skjernov
 (1390-1440) Markvard Pedersen Skjernov
 (1440-1461) Markvard Markvardsen Skjernov
 (1461-1476) Widow Skjernov
 (1476-1480) Iver Andersen Skjernov
 (1480-1499) Markvard Iversen Skjernov
 (1499-1540) Niels Markvardsen Skjernov
 (1540) Niels Nielsen Skjernov
 (1540-1560) Niels Markvardsen Skjernov
 (1560-1565) Dorte Nielsdatter Tornekrands married Skjernov
 (1565-1577) Axel Sørensen Juul
 (1577-1589) Absalon Axelsen Juul
 (1589-1604) Ove Axelsen Juul
 (1604-1613) Frands Ovesen Juul
 (1613-1619) Jørgen Kaas
 (1619-1634) Dorte Frandsdatter Juul married Kaas
 (1634-1663) Christoffer Bille / Steen Bille
 (1663-1681) Erik Høg Banner
 (1681-1689) Iver Juul Eriksen Høg Banner
 (1689) Helle Trolle married (1) Høg Banner (2) Krag
 (1689-1694) Palle Krag
 (1694-1703) Adam Ernst von Pentz
 (1703-1708) Henrik Bille
 (1708-1711) Ingeborg Christine Adamsdatter von Pentz married (1) Bille (2) Sehested
 (1711-1719) Kjeld Krag Sehested
 (1719-1720) Slægten Sehested
 (1720-1737) Poul Rosenørn
 (1737-1747) Johan Nicolaj Poulsen Rosenørn
 (1747-1752) Sophie Amalie Dyre married (1) Rosenørn (2) von der Osten
 (1752-1769) Otto Christopher von Osten
 (1769-1783) Christian Kallager
 (1783-1800) Hans Friedrich von Brüggermann
 (1800-1804) Charlotte Dorothea Gotholdine von Körbitz married von Brüggermann
 (1804) Peter Andreas Kolderup-Rosenvinge / P. Schandorff
 (1804-1810) Adam Christoffer von Knuth
 (1810-1823) Lars Lassen
 (1823-1839) The Danish government
 (1839-1840) H.P. Hansen
 (1840-1845) Peter Johansen de Neergaard
 (1845-1868) Christian Frederik Olsen
 (1868-1888) Christian Frederik Theophilus Alexander baron Juel-Brockdorff
 (1888-1931) Niels Joachim Christian Gregers Iuel
 (1931-1941) Christian Frederik Nielsen Iuel
 (1941-1959) Kate Harriet Ryan Treschow married Iuel
 (1959-1986) Niels Christiansen Iuel
 (1986-) Michael Frederik Nielsen Iuel

References

External links
 Meilgaard Gods website

Castles in Denmark